Vania King and Monica Niculescu were the defending champions, but King chose not to participate this year. Niculescu played alongside Simona Halep, but lost in the first round to Natela Dzalamidze and Veronika Kudermetova.

Andrea Hlaváčková and Peng Shuai won the title, defeating Raluca Olaru and Olga Savchuk in the final, 6–1, 7–5.

Seeds

Draw

References
 Draw

WTA Shenzhen Open
2017 Doubles